Sarangesa penningtoni is a species of butterfly in the family Hesperiidae. It is found in northern Zambia.

References

Butterflies described in 1951
Celaenorrhinini